Baywatch is a 2017 American action comedy film directed by Seth Gordon, with a screenplay by Mark Swift and Damian Shannon, from a story by Jay Scherick, David Ronn, Thomas Lennon, and Robert Ben Garant. It is based on the television series created by Michael Berk, Douglas Schwartz, and Gregory J. Bonann. The film stars Dwayne Johnson and Zac Efron. The story follows lifeguard Mitch Buchannon and his team who must take down a drug lord in an effort to save their beach.

Principal photography began on February 22, 2016, in Florida and Savannah, Georgia. The film was released in the United States on May 25, 2017, by Paramount Pictures, grossed $177 million worldwide and received negative reviews. Baywatch received five nominations at the 38th Golden Raspberry Awards, including Worst Picture and Worst Actor for Efron.

Plot
In Emerald Bay, Florida, Lt. Mitch Buchannon is a beloved member of an elite lifeguard division known as Baywatch. The Baywatch, including second-in-command Stephanie Holden and veteran C.J. Parker, protect the beaches and the bay and are opposed by jealous beat cop Garner Ellerbee and his superior, Captain Thorpe.

On morning patrol, Mitch finds a small pouch of flakka by the Huntley Club, owned by powerful businesswoman Victoria Leeds. Later, Mitch meets Matt Brody, an entitled Olympic gold medal-winning swimmer who expects to make the Baywatch team without trying out. Mitch and Brody compete in a variety of physical tests, which Mitch wins. As the course is ending, a mom and her two kids fall into the water and the lifeguards and Brody rush to save them. Brody makes the team along with Ronnie Greenbaum and Summer Quinn.

A private yacht catches fire and the occupants are evacuated by Baywatch except for city councilman Rodriguez, who dies. Suspicious, Mitch and his team continue to investigate to Ellerbee's disapproval. They infiltrate the hospital morgue and take a video of Leeds' henchmen planting an autopsy report to cover up Rodriguez's murder, but are discovered and the recording is destroyed. Thorpe threatens to fire Mitch if he oversteps again.

Convinced Leeds is running drugs through the Huntley, Mitch and Brody go undercover and witness drugs being retrieved from barrels of fish. When they contact Ellerbee, they learn another dead body has been found on the beach. Thorpe, enraged that Mitch deserted his post, fires him, naming Brody the new lieutenant. Brody doesn't want the job but is forced to take it.

Brody later sees "sand grifters (beach thieves)" steal bags using a cooler. He orders them off the beach and keeps the cooler. After finding another pouch of flakka on the beach, Brody uses the cooler to steal the second victim's report from Ellerbee brings it to Summer, who confirms the man was killed by knife instead of a shark attack. Ronnie recognizes the victim as his friend Dave, who was working for the Huntley. Brody realizes that Mitch was right about the Huntley. Ronnie hacks into Leeds' servers, finding her plan to privatize the entire beach.

The team infiltrate a private party on Leeds' personal yacht and discover that she's been using the hull to smuggle the drugs. Brody is captured and thrown in a bait cage. A gloating Leeds reveals she bribed Thorpe to replace Mitch with Brody before pushing the cage into the water. Before Brody can drown, Summer swims to him and gives him mouth-to-mouth resuscitation. However, he's hallucinating and realizes it is actually Mitch.

They catch up to Leeds before she can escape on a helicopter, but she captures Brody. Mitch aims a Roman candle at her and Ronnie and C. J. launch the fireworks, blowing her up. Ellerbee arrives, takes Leeds' henchmen into custody, and apologizes to Mitch. Thorpe arrives, berating Mitch for returning to the beach. Brody punches him in the face and Thorpe is arrested for his role in Leeds' plan.

Sometime later, Ronnie and Brody begin relationships with C.J. and Summer, respectively. Mitch, reinstated, announces that Summer, Ronnie, and Brody are no longer trainees and introduces them to their new captain, Casey Jean.

Cast

 Dwayne Johnson as Lieutenant Mitch Buchannon
 Zac Efron as Matt Brody
 Priyanka Chopra as Victoria Leeds
 Alexandra Daddario as Summer Quinn
 Jon Bass as Ronnie Greenbaum 
 Kelly Rohrbach as C. J. Parker 
 Ilfenesh Hadera as Stephanie Holden 
 Yahya Abdul-Mateen II as Sergeant Garner Ellerbee
 Rob Huebel as Captain Thorpe
 Hannibal Buress as Dave, The Tech
 Oscar Nunez as Councilman Rodriguez
 Amin Joseph as Frankie
 Jack Kesy as Leon
 Belinda Peregrín as Carmen
 Pamela Anderson as Captain Casey Jean Parker

 David Hasselhoff as The Mentor

Production
A Baywatch movie was first announced in 2004, although the movie became stuck in development hell over the years, with several writers penning drafts. In July 2015, Sean Anders was replaced by Seth Gordon as director. On October 2, 2014, Dwayne Johnson was attached to star in the lead role, and Justin Malen was set to rewrite the script. Damian Shannon and Mark Swift wrote the latest draft, and the film would be comedic in style. On August 10, 2015, Zac Efron signed on to star in the film, and Beau Flynn and Ivan Reitman joined to produce with Johnson's Seven Bucks Productions. On November 9, 2015, Deadline reported that seven actresses were among the short list testing for the lead female role, Alexandra Daddario, Ashley Benson, Nina Dobrev, Alexandra Shipp, Shelley Hennig, Bianca A. Santos, and Denyse Tontz. On November 18, 2015, Johnson confirmed Daddario would play Summer, a lifeguard, and the love interest of Efron's character.

On January 4, 2016, Kelly Rohrbach's casting as C. J. Parker was confirmed by Johnson's Instagram post. Damian Shannon and Mark Swift wrote the screenplay, while the final list of producers were Johnson along with his partner Dany Garcia, through their Seven Bucks Productions, as well as Flynn, Reitman, Michael Berk, Douglas Schwartz, and Gregory J. Bonann. On January 20, 2016, Johnson again posted on his Instagram about casting Ilfenesh Hadera as Johnson's love interest. On January 27, 2016, Jon Bass was cast in the film to play Ronnie, a funny, awkward, and skilled disco dancer at the beach, who falls in love with Parker. On February 12, 2016, Hannibal Buress joined the cast of the film to play a bay community local. On February 17, 2016, Priyanka Chopra signed on to star as the antagonist in the film. The role was originally written for a male. In March 2016, Yahya Abdul-Mateen II joined the cast as Ellerbee, a police officer who is constantly reminding Mitch that he has no real authority over the bay. Jack Kesy and Amin Joseph were also cast in the film. Vine (later YouTube) star Logan Paul announced that he is in the film, but his scenes were later cut. Izabel Goulart also appeared. NFL players Vernon Davis and Arian Foster also have cameo appearances in the film.

Filming 
Principal photography on the film began on February 22, 2016, in Deerfield Beach, Florida, with the setting in Broward County, Florida, while the TV series was set in Malibu, California. The film was shot in Miami and Savannah, Georgia. In late March 2016, filming started in Tybee Island, Georgia. Filming wrapped on May 18, 2016.

Release
In January 2016, Paramount Pictures scheduled Baywatch for a May 19, 2017 release, which was originally scheduled for a sequel to Terminator Genisys. In December 2016, Paramount pushed the release date back one week to May 26, 2017, to avoid competition with Alien: Covenant. In April 2017, the film was moved one day earlier, to avoid direct competition with Pirates of the Caribbean: Dead Men Tell No Tales.

Reception

Box office
Baywatch grossed $58.1 million in the United States and Canada and $119.8 million in other territories, for a worldwide total of $177.8 million, against a production budget of $69 million (not including marketing and distribution costs).

In the United States and Canada, the film was initially projected to gross around $40 million from 3,642 theaters over its five-day opening weekend, with the studio predicting a more conservative $30 million debut. It made $1.25 million at 2,554 theaters from Wednesday night previews, similar to fellow mid-week R-rated releases We're the Millers ($1.7 million) and Let's Be Cops ($1.2 million). However, after making $4.6 million on its opening day (including Wednesday night previews) and $5.7 million on Friday, five-day projections were lowered to $25 million. It ended up grossing $18.5 million in its opening weekend (for a five-day total of $27.7 million), finishing third at the box office, behind Pirates of the Caribbean: Dead Men Tell No Tales ($63 million) and Guardians of the Galaxy Vol. 2 ($20.9 million). In its second weekend the film grossed $8.8 million (a drop of 52.5%), finishing 5th at the box office.

Critical response
On review aggregation website Rotten Tomatoes, the film has an approval rating of 17% based on 246 reviews, and an average rating of 4.00/10. The website's critical consensus reads, "Baywatch takes its source material's jiggle factor to R-rated levels, but lacks the original's campy charm – and leaves its charming stars flailing in the shallows." On Metacritic the film has a weighted average score of 37 out of 100, based on 47 critics, indicating "generally unfavorable reviews". Audiences polled by CinemaScore gave the film an average grade of "B+" on an A+ to F scale, while PostTrak reported filmgoers gave it a 76% overall positive score. Dwayne Johnson responded to critics' reviews, saying that the film was made for fans and that they loved it.

Writing for Rolling Stone, Peter Travers praised the "easy rapport" of Johnson and Efron while saying, "what [the film] needs more is a functional script". Travers rated it two out of four stars and said, "Think of yourself sitting down for a big two-hour wallow in instant stupid with a vat of popcorn, slathered in fake butter and possibly a mound of melted M&Ms on top. It feels great chugging it down, then your stomach hurts, your head aches and you puke the whole thing up so you can forget about it in the morning. That's Baywatch in a nutshell." Owen Gleiberman of Variety called it "stupidly entertaining... for a while" but was critical of the plot. Brian Truitt  of USA Today gave the film two out of four stars, and said that while the film has all the elements you would expect "the remake yearns to be both sendup farce and straight action film, tripping along the way and failing to grasp either." Richard Roeper of the Chicago Sun-Times gave the film 1.5 out of 4 stars, writing: "As was the case with CHiPS, The Dukes of Hazzard, The Beverly Hillbillies, Car 54, Where Are You? and I'll just stop there, when you make films from junk TV, more often than not you're going to wind up with a junk movie."

Home media
Baywatch was released on Digital HD on August 15, 2017 and on Blu-ray and DVD on August 29, 2017.

Accolades

Potential sequel 
In May 2017, producer Beau Flynn revealed plans for a sequel were in development, with the project's story already written. Damian Shannon and Mark Swift were stated to be returning to their roles as co-screenwriters, while the plot would revolve around the titular team's adventures in traveling to a different environment overseas. Dwayne Johnson and Zac Efron entered early negotiations to reprise their roles, while the remaining cast were expected to also return in the potential sequel.

References

External links 
 
 

2017 films
2010s English-language films
2017 action comedy films
2010s buddy comedy films
American action comedy films
American buddy comedy films
Baywatch
Films about lifesaving
Films based on television series
Films set in 2017
Films set in Florida
Films set on beaches
Films shot in California
Films shot in Florida
Films shot in Savannah, Georgia
Films shot in Miami
The Montecito Picture Company films
Paramount Pictures films
Films directed by Seth Gordon
Films produced by Beau Flynn
Films produced by Ivan Reitman
Seven Bucks Productions films
Films with screenplays by Mark Swift and Damian Shannon
2017 comedy films
Golden Raspberry Award winning films
2010s American films
Skydance Media films
Uncharted films